Cornelio Musso (or Cornelius) (1511–1574) was an Italian Friar Minor Conventual, Bishop of Bitonto (1544–1574), Bishop of Bertinoro (1541–1544), and prominent at the Council of Trent. He was, perhaps, the most renowned orator of his day, styled the "Italian Demosthenes". Returning to ancient patristic models, he raised the homily to a high form of perfection.

Biography
Musso was born at Piacenza. On 14 Nov 1541, he was appointed during the papacy of Pope Paul III as Bishop of Bertinoro. On 27 Oct 1544, he was transferred by Pope Paul III to the Diocese of Bitonto.
He served as Bishop of Bitonto until his death on 13 Jan 1574. He was among the first three bishops present at the Council of Trent, where he delivered the inaugural oration, distinguishing himself especially at the debates on justification. In 1560 he was sent as papal legate to Emperor Ferdinand.

He wrote: "De divina historia libri tres" (Venice, 1585; 1587); "Comment. in epist. ad Romanos" (Venice, 1588); "De operibus sex dierum" (Venice, 1598). His "Conciones evangeliorum" and "Sermones" (ed. by Jos. Musso, Venice, 1580) were translated into Latin by Michael ab Isselt (Cologne, 1594).

He served as Bishop of Bitonto until his death on 13 Jan 1574. Musso was buried in the Basilica of Santi Apostoli, the Curia of the Order of Friars Minor Conventual, in Rome.

Episcopal succession
While bishop, he was the principal consecrator of:
Sisto Diuzioli, Bishop of Carinola (1572);
and the principal co-consecrator of:
Gian Antonio Fassano, Titular Bishop of Christopolis and Auxiliary Bishop of Monreale;
Giovanni Antonio Lazzari, Bishop of Amelia (1572);
Jakob Feucht, Titular Bishop of Athyra and Auxiliary Bishop of Bamberg (1572);
Giulio Fioretti, Bishop of Chiron (1572); and
César Alamagna Cardona, Bishop of Cava de' Tirreni (1572).

References

Gaudentius Guggenbichler, Beiträge z. Kirchengesch. d. 16. und 17. Jahrh. (Bozen, 1880), 48 sqq.
Manuale dei Minori Conventuali, 324 sq.
Pallavicino, Istoria de concilio di Trento (Rome, 1883), passim
Keppler in Theologische Quartalschrift (Tübingen, 1892), 98
Hugo von Hurter, Nomenclator Lit., III (3rd ed.), 84 sqq.

External links
 

1511 births
1574 deaths
Conventual Friars Minor
Bishops of Bitonto
Participants in the Council of Trent
16th-century Italian Roman Catholic bishops
Conventual Franciscan bishops
Bishops appointed by Pope Paul III